This is a list of flag bearers who have represented Guam at the Olympics.

Flag bearers carry the national flag of their country at the opening ceremony of the Olympic Games.

See also
Guam at the Olympics

References

Flag bearers
Guam
Olympic flagbearers